Coromandel was a governorate of the Dutch East India Company on the coasts of the Coromandel region from 1610, until the company's liquidation in 1798. Dutch presence in the region began with the capture of Pulicat from the Portuguese in Goa and Bombay-Bassein. Coromandel remained a colony of the Kingdom of the Netherlands until 1825, when it was relinquished to the British according to the Anglo-Dutch Treaty of 1824. It was part of what is today called Dutch India.

History 

In 1606, a Dutch ship stopped on the shores of the Karimanal Village near Pulicat, north of the mouth of the lake requesting water. Local Muslims offered food and help to the Dutch. They struck a trade partnership to procure and supply local merchandise to the Dutch for trade in the East Indies.

Empress  Eraivi, a wife of Emperor Venkata II of Vijayanagara, ruled Prelaya Kaveri and during her reign in 1608 the Dutch East India Company was given permission to build a fort and do trading. They built a fort named Geldria at Pulicat as a defense from other invading armies'  kings and the Portuguese, from where they soon monopolized the lucrative textiles trade with the East Indies and other countries in the region. Under pressure from the Dutch, an English trading post was established in 1619, but this post was disbanded in 1622. The Dutch establishment met with stiff resistance from the Portuguese, who conducted several attacks on the harbor. In 1611, Venkatatapati turned against the Portuguese and the Jesuits were ordered to leave Chandragiri and the Dutch were permitted to build a fort at Pulicat.

The Portuguese tried unsuccessfully to recapture Pulicat in 1614, 1623, and 1633, but never succeeded. From 1616 to 1690, Pulicat was the official headquarters of Dutch Coromandel.

Manufacture of cloth for export was the sole occupation of several indigenous groups in Pulicat and the hinterlands of Tamil, Telugu and Kannada territories, and it is likely that over 1,000 handlooms operated in Pulicat alone. In the 1620s, the Dutch East India Company established a gunpowder factory in Pulicat. Its output was so substantial that for several decades it was able to keep many of the major Dutch trading centers in the East Indies and homeward-bound fleets well supplied. In 1615, the first VOC mint in India was established in Fort Gelria where, initially, "Kas" copper coins with VOC monogram and a Sanskrit legend were minted. The Pulicat mint operated till 1674, when a new mint was established at Nagapattinam. These coins were widely used in Ceylon.

The rise and fall of Nagapattinam 
The headquarters of the colony shifted to Nagapattinam in 1690, after the Dutch had begun working on their Fort Vijf Sinnen three years earlier. The heavily armed fort in the end proved useless in the 1781 siege of Negapatam, in which the British took the fort. In the Treaty of Paris of 1784, which ended the Fourth Anglo-Dutch War of which this siege was part, Nagapattinam was not restored to Dutch rule, but instead remained British. The headquarters of the colony shifted back to Pulicat.

By the early 18th century, Pulicat's population has been estimated to have declined to just over 10,000. In 1746, the monsoon failed, resulting in a devastating famine. In the larger towns of Pulicat and Santhome alone the death toll was put at 15,000 and only one third of the textile weavers, painters and washers survived. Cloth prices increased 15% and little was available even at that price. An even more significant cause of the Dutch decline was conquest of the area by the Golconda forces commanded by Mir Jumla.

Occupation by the British, restoration to the Dutch and eventual cession 
Owing to the Kew Letters written by Dutch stadtholder William V, British troops occupied Dutch Coromandel to prevent it from being overrun by the French. Dutch governor Jacob Eilbracht capitulated to the British on 15 July 1795. In 1804, British forces blew up Fort Geldria.

The Anglo-Dutch Treaty of 1814 restored Dutch Coromandel to Dutch rule. A commission under the leadership of Jacob Andries van Braam was installed by the Dutch East Indies government on 28 June 1817 to effect the transfer of the Dutch possessions on the Indian subcontinent, which arrived on the Coromandel Coast in January 1818. After protracted negotiations, the Dutch possessions were eventually handed over on 31 March 1818, with a ceremonial striking of the Union Jack in Fort Sadras, the new capital of Dutch Coromandel, and a subsequent hoisting of the Dutch flag. F. C. Regel was installed as the new governor of Dutch Coromandel, who now went by the title of opperhoofd. Regel was succeeded in 1824 by the young administrator Henricus Franciscus von Söhsten.

The restoration of Dutch rule did not last long. On 1 June 1825, seven years after the possessions were restored to the Dutch, Dutch Coromandel was again ceded to the British, owing to the provisions of the Anglo-Dutch Treaty of 1824.

Except for two short breaks, Dutch rule of Pulicat lasted for 214 years between 1606 and 1825 till the King of Arcot acceded Chingleput District (which included Pulicat village) to the British in 1825.

Legacy 
Pulicat today bears silent testimony to the Dutch, with the Dutch Fort dating back to 1609 in ruins, a Dutch Church and Cemetery with 22 protected tombs dating from 1631 to 1655 and another Dutch Cemetery with 76 tombs and mausoleums protected by the Archaeological Survey of India (ASI). Dutch architects and scholars now intend to support efforts to restore these early Dutch settlements. The Dutch Hospital building in Pulicat dating from 1640 is to be renovated in the near future.

Sadras still features a Dutch fort and a cemetery. Although the remains of Fort Vijf Sinnen and the Dutch cemetery in Nagapattinam have almost completely vanished, the Dutch Saint Peter's Church, Nagapattinam still remains standing. Near Masulipatam, there are remnants of the Dutch-built Bandar Fort and a Dutch cemetery. Bheemunipatnam features two Dutch cemeteries and some remnants of Dutch colonial buildings.  Tuticorin, which was governed from Dutch Ceylon until 1796, but became a residency of Dutch Coromandel in 1817 after Ceylon was relinquished to the British, still features the Holy Trinity Church, Tuticorin, built by the Dutch.

Forts and trading posts

See also

Notes

References
Azariah, Dr. Jayapaul. Paliacatte to Pulicat 1400 to 2007, CRENIEO (2007)
Ch. 1, Pulicat Lake – Geographical Location and Bio-Geomorphology
Ch. 2, Early Asian kingdoms, Historical Perspective
Ch. 3, Pulicat Place Names Through History
Ch. 4, History of Dutch Fort in Maps, The Fort and Its Settlements – Pallaicatta
Ch. 5, Dutch Trade Relations
Ch. 6, Economics of Trade Relations
Ch. 7, Community at Pulicat
Ch. 8, Church History
Ch. 9, The Birth of a Lake
Ch. 10, Fish and Fisheries
Ch. 11,  Present Day Pulicat Indicating Infrastructural Facilities

External links

A photoblog on Fort Sadras

European colonisation in Asia
Coromandel Coast
 
Dutch Coromandel
Former trading posts of the Dutch East India Company
Former settlements and colonies of the Dutch East India Company
1608 establishments in Dutch India
1825 disestablishments in Dutch India